Macroporidae is a family of bryozoans belonging to the order Cheilostomatida.

Genera:
 Lepralis
 Macropora MacGillivray, 1895

References

Cheilostomatida